Leo Johannes Roininen (16 July 1928 – 21 April 2002) was a Canadian javelin thrower and shot putter who competed in the 1948 Summer Olympics. He was born in Toronto and died in Sudbury.

References

1928 births
2002 deaths
Athletes from Toronto
Canadian male javelin throwers
Canadian male shot putters
Olympic track and field athletes of Canada
Athletes (track and field) at the 1948 Summer Olympics
Athletes (track and field) at the 1950 British Empire Games
Commonwealth Games gold medallists for Canada
Commonwealth Games bronze medallists for Canada
Commonwealth Games medallists in athletics
20th-century Canadian people
21st-century Canadian people
Medallists at the 1950 British Empire Games